Champions of Ruin is a hardcover accessory for the 3.5 edition of the Dungeons & Dragons fantasy role-playing game.

Contents

Champions of Ruin is a world setting supplement, detailing the role of evil in the Forgotten Realms setting.

Publication history
Champions of Ruin was published in May 2005, and was designed by Jeff Crook, Wil Upchurch, and Eric L. Boyd. Cover art was by Lucio Parillo, with interior art by Thomas M. Baxa, Wayne England, Jason Engle, Ralph Horsley, Warren Mahy, Raven Mimura, William O'Connor, Lucio Parillo, and Marc Sasso.

Reception

Reviews

References

Forgotten Realms sourcebooks
Role-playing game supplements introduced in 2005